Cheon Jinwoo is the H.G. Underwood Professor at Yonsei University and the Director of the Center for Nanomedicine, Institute for Basic Science (IBS). As a leading chemist in inorganic materials chemistry and nanomedicine Cheon and his group research chemical principles for the preparation of complex inorganic materials. He has been a Clarivate Analytics Highly Cited Researcher both in the field of chemistry in 2014, 2015, 2016 and cross-field in 2018. He is a fellow of the American Chemical Society, Royal Society of Chemistry, and Korean Academy of Science and Technology, a senior editor of Accounts of Chemical Research and an editorial advisory board member of Journal of Materials Chemistry, Nano Letters and Materials Horizons.

Education
Cheon enrolled in Yonsei University in 1981 majoring in chemistry. He later obtained a Bachelor of Science and Master of Science in 1985 and 1987, respectively. Studying under Professor Gregory S. Girolami, Cheon received a Ph.D. in chemistry from the University of Illinois at Urbana-Champaign in 1993. Staying in the U.S., he did postdoc work in the University of California Berkeley

Career
Staying in the U.S., Cheon was a postdoc in the University of California Berkeley. For the next three years, he was a staff research associate at UCLA before returning to Korea to work as an assistant and then associate professor at KAIST. His research at KAIST focused on geometrical shape control of nanoparticles and magnetic particles. This also marked his first publication on nanocrystals which is a reoccurring interest in his research career and a source of multiple highly cited articles.

He started working at Yonsei University as a full professor in 2002 and later became the Horace G. Underwood Professor in 2008. His research at Yonsei on nanoscale phenomena has led to nanomaterial applications in biology, including highly sensitive MRI contrast agents and  nanoscale toolkits for cells. A notable study is from 2004, when he demonstrated the principle of size-dependent MRI contrast effects using nanoparticles which enabled the development of magnetism-engineered iron oxide (MEIO) as an ultra-sensitive nanoparticle MRI contrast agent which might help detect early stage cancer.

From 2010 to 2016, Cheon was the director of the National Creative Research Initiative Center for Evolutionary Nanoparticles. From 2015, he became the director of the newly established Yonsei-Institute of Basic Science Center for Nanomedicine at the Yonsei University Sinchon campus.

Awards and honors
2018: Madhuri and Jagdish N. Sheth International Alumni Award for Exceptional Achievement (University of Illinois)
2015: Ho-Am Prize in Science (HOAM Foundation)
2014: The World's Most Influential Scientific Minds (Thomson Reuters)
2013: KCS Academic Achievement Award (Korean Chemical Society)
2012: POSCO TJ Park Science Award (POSCO Foundation)
2012: Korea's 100 Most Influential Person for Next 10 Years (DongA Daily News)
2010: Inchon Prize (Inchon Memorial Foundation)
2007: Song-Gok Science Prize (Korea Institute of Science and Technology)
2004: KCS Award in Inorganic Chemistry (Korean Chemical Society) 
2002: Young Scientist Award, Korean Academy of Science and Technology
2001: Wiley Young Chemist Award (Korean Chemical Society-Wiley & Sons)

Selected recent publications

References

External links
Google Scholar Jinwoo Cheon
IBS Center for NanoMedicine

1962 births
Living people
Institute for Basic Science
Organic chemists
Recipients of the Ho-Am Prize in Science
South Korean chemists
South Korean scientists